The 2018 Telus Cup was Canada's 40th annual national midget 'AAA' hockey championship contested April 23 – 29, 2018 at the Sudbury Community Arena in Sudbury, Ontario. The Notre Dame Hounds defeated the Cantonniers de Magog in the gold medal game to win their fifth national championship.
Sudbury previously hosted the event in 1998.

Teams

Round robin

Tiebreaker: Head-to-head record, most wins, highest goal differential.

Playoffs

Individual awards
Most Valuable Player: Ronan Seeley (Lethbridge)
Top Scorer(s): Brad Morrissey (Notre Dame), Jeremey Rainville (Magog)
Top Forward: Zach Stinger (Lethbridge)
Top Defensive Player: Thomas Lucas (Notre Dame)
Top Goaltender: Alex Vendette (Sudbury)
Most Sportsmanlike Player: Brad Morrissey (Notre Dame)
Most Dedicated: Joel Mongeon (Sudbury)

Road to the Telus Cup

Atlantic Region
Moncton Flyers advance by winning regional championship played March 29-April 1, 2018 at Lantz, Nova Scotia.

Québec
Cantonniers de Magog advance by winning Quebec Midget AAA Hockey League championship.

Central Region
Toronto Young Nationals advance by winning regional championship played April 1–8, 2018 at Rockland, Ontario.West Region
Tournament to be played April 5–8, 2018 at Fort William First Nation near Thunder Bay, Ontario.Full standings and statistics available at Pointstreak.com.''

Pacific Region
Lethbridge Hurriances advance by winning best-of-three series played April 6–7, 2018 at Prospera Centre in Chilliwack, British Columbia.

See also
Telus Cup

References

External links
2018 Telus Cup Home Page
Midget AAA Canada Website
Midget AAA Telus Cup Regional Championship Website

Telus Cup
Telus Cup 2018
Telus Cup
April 2018 sports events in Canada
Telus Cup 2018